Oxfordshire County Library (until 2017 known as Oxford Central Library) is the main public library in the city of Oxford, England.

The library opened in its current location in 1973 above shops in  Westgate, Oxford. Over 500,000 items are available for loan. The library is run by Oxfordshire County Council. The library has used the OpenGalaxy library automation system since 2003.

Due to the redevelopment of the Westgate Centre, the library closed to the public on February 27, 2016. During the Westgate redevelopment it temporarily relocated to a smaller location in the neighbouring Oxford Castle complex.

The library reopened at the Westgate on December 18, 2017 and was renamed as the Oxfordshire County Library upon reopening.

References 

Libraries established in 1973
Central Library
Public libraries in Oxfordshire